Bahram Jalali is a professor and Northrop Grumman Opto-Electric Chair of Electrical Engineering at University of California, Los Angeles, mainly working in physical and wave electronics. He is also a published author of 10 books; the highest held book is in 125 libraries.

He is a Fellow of the American Physical Society, SPIE, Institute of Electrical and Electronics Engineers and The Optical Society. In 2007, he was given the Robert W. Wood Award by the Optical Society. He has been widely cited, the highest of which are both 1038 and 1030 times. In 2016, he led the research team involving image detection algorithms.

Jalali received his Ph.D. in Applied Physics at Columbia University in 1989 and worked with Bell Laboratories until 2002 before joining UCLA's faculty.

He was elected to the National Academy of Engineering in 2022.

References

Year of birth missing (living people)
Living people
UCLA Henry Samueli School of Engineering and Applied Science faculty
American electrical engineers
Columbia School of Engineering and Applied Science alumni
Members of the United States National Academy of Engineering
Fellows of the American Physical Society